Olimarabidopsis is a genus of flowering plants belonging to the family Brassicaceae.

Its native range is Crimea to Mongolia and Western Himalaya.

Species
Species:

Olimarabidopsis cabulica 
Olimarabidopsis pumila 
Olimarabidopsis umbrosa

References

Brassicaceae
Brassicaceae genera